Sateng Nok is a tambon (sub-district) of Mueang Yala District, in Yala Province, Thailand. In 2017 it had a population of 31,725 persons.

Sateng Nok lies on the border with Pattani Province in the north of Yala Province. It sits astride Route 4082 off Route 4106, south of Khao Tum and north of Krong Pinang District. The Yala Railway runs through the centre of the urban area. The Tham Phab Khien Fa Panang Caves lie to the east of Sateng on the way to Budi. They contain some 500-year-old rock paintings. The area was flooded in November–December 2011 and several people lost their lives.

Administration

Central administration
The tambon is divided into 13 administrative villages (mubans).

Local administration
The area of the sub-district is covered by the town (thesaban mueang) Sateng Nok (เทศบาลเมืองสะเตงนอก).

References

External links
Sateng Nok Sub-district administrative organization

Tambon of Yala Province